Antonina P. Uccello (May 19, 1922March 14, 2023) was an American politician who was Mayor of Hartford, Connecticut, from 1967 to 1971.

Life and career

Uccello was born in Hartford, Connecticut, on May 19, 1922, to parents who had emigrated from Sicily.

When she was elected the mayor of Hartford in 1967, she became also the first woman mayor in Connecticut.

At the time, Uccello was an executive in the Hartford department store G. Fox & Co. She approached her boss in 1963 and said she would like to run for the Hartford City Council. Since the council met on Mondays, a day the department store was closed, her boss gave her permission to run. She served two terms on the council before being elected mayor in 1967. She ran as a Republican in a mainly Democratic city, and remains the city's last Republican mayor to date. She was re-elected as mayor in 1969, and was subsequently asked by President Richard Nixon to go to Washington D.C. to work in the U.S. Department of Transportation, where she subsequently worked during the successive administrations of Presidents Gerald Ford and Jimmy Carter.

Uccello turned 100 in May 2022, and died on March 12, 2023.

Honours

Uccello was inducted into the Connecticut Women's Hall of Fame in 1999. Ann Street in Hartford was renamed in her honor in September 2008. Another street, in Canicattini Bagni, Italy, was named after her in July 2016.

References 

1922 births
2023 deaths
Women mayors of places in Connecticut
Politicians from Hartford, Connecticut
Mayors of Hartford, Connecticut
Connecticut Republicans
Nixon administration personnel
Ford administration personnel
Carter administration personnel
United States Department of Transportation officials
Connecticut city council members
Women city councillors in Connecticut
20th-century American politicians
20th-century American women politicians
American centenarians
Women centenarians
American people of Italian descent